Miles Guthrie Tomalin Robbins (born May 4, 1992) is an American musician and actor.

Personal life and education
Miles Guthrie Tomalin Robbins was born on May 4, 1992, in New York City. He studied documentary film and music production at Brown University for three years but left before graduation.

He is a son of the actors Tim Robbins and Susan Sarandon. His half-sister is the actress Eva Amurri, and his older brother is the director Jack Henry Robbins.

Music career
Robbins has worked as a disc jockey. In his current psychedelic pop band called the Pow Pow Family Band, Robbins performed as a character called "Milly", a "disgruntled housewife" with an affinity for dresses and red lipstick.

Acting career
In The X-Files, Robbins played William, the teenage son of Dana Scully and Fox Mulder.

Robbins had small roles in My Friend Dahmer, and Mozart in the Jungle, and as Dee Dee Ramone in The Get Down.

In the Kay Cannon directed Blockers, Robbins played Connor, also known as 'The Chef', the prom date of Geraldine Viswanathan who played the daughter of John Cena.

Robbins appeared in Halloween (2018), a sequel to the 1978 film of the same name. He also had roles in a film adaptation of Taipei by Tao Lin, and the Chris Morris production The Day Shall Come, filmed in the Dominican Republic with Anna Kendrick.

Filmography

Film

Television

Video games

References

External links

1992 births
Living people
Male actors from New York City
American male television actors
American male film actors
American pop musicians
American people of Italian descent